Kalamari is a Slovenian musical group consisting of Jože Jež Pepi, Matjaž Švagelj, Boštjan Tršar, and Egon Prinčič.

Eurovision 2010
Together with Roka Žlindre, Kalamari represented Slovenia in the Eurovision Song Contest 2010 with the song "Narodnozabavni rock". Of Kalamari's four members, only Jože Jež Pepi and Matjaž Švagelj performed at Eurovision.

They failed to qualify for the final of the 2010 Eurovision Song Contest, as they reached 16th place (out of 17).

References

Slovenia in the Eurovision Song Contest
Eurovision Song Contest entrants for Slovenia
Eurovision Song Contest entrants of 2010